Iñaki Williams Arthuer (born 15 June 1994) is a professional footballer who plays as a forward for La Liga club Athletic Bilbao and the Ghana national team.

Developed at Athletic Bilbao's academy, he has made over 350 first-team appearances for the club, including a La Liga record of 251 consecutive games. He scored the winning goal of the 2020–21 Supercopa de España.

Born in Spain to Ghanaian parents, Williams made his full debut for the Spain national team in 2016. In 2022, he chose to represent Ghana at international level, being selected for the 2022 World Cup.

Club career

Early life and youth career
Born in Bilbao, Biscay to Ghanaian parents (who reached Spain by crossing the Sahara on foot and jumping the Melilla border fence), Williams spent most of his childhood living in Pamplona, specifically the  neighbourhood, and was playing youth football with local CD Pamplona when he was spotted by Athletic Bilbao, who signed him to their youth setup at Lezama at the age of 18. He spent his first season with the Juvenil A side and made a big impression, scoring at the rate of almost a goal a game (eventually ending with 36); the team finished runners-up in the Copa del Rey Juvenil de Fútbol, and on 25 June 2013 he signed a new contract with the Basque club, running until 2017.

Williams began 2013–14 playing with the farm team Basconia who competed in the Tercera División. After suffering a knee injury in August, he returned to activity in October, making his senior debut and marking it with a goal. He was immediately called up to the reserves in the Segunda División B and by the end of the same month had played his first match and scored his first goals at that level; he spent the campaign alternating between both squads.

At the start of 2014–15, Williams scored a hat-trick for Bilbao Athletic in a 4–0 win against Amorebieta, and followed this on 7 September 2014 with another treble in a 5–1 win over Leioa. Despite only playing the first half of the season, his 13 goals from 18 appearances helped the team ascend to the Segunda División.

Athletic Bilbao
On 6 December 2014, after profiting from Aritz Aduriz's injury, Williams made his first-team (and La Liga) debut, starting in a 1–0 home loss against Córdoba. He netted his first goal on 19 February of the following year, starting and contributing to a 2–2 draw at Torino in the UEFA Europa League round of 32, becoming in the process the first black player to score for the club.

On 17 May 2015, Williams scored his first goal in the top flight, netting a last-minute winner in a 3–2 away victory over Elche to help Athletic come from being behind 2–0. Thirteen days later, he headed a consolation goal in the 3–1 loss to Barcelona in the final of the Copa del Rey at the Camp Nou. He missed the 2015 Supercopa de España victory over the same opponents three months later through injury.

Williams scored a brace (before giving away a penalty) in a 3–1 win away to Betis, on 1 November 2015. He repeated the feat the following match, at home against Partizan in the Europa League group stage (5–1). Finding the net in his third match running, he scored "a phenomenal volley" to help beat Espanyol 2–1 at the San Mamés.

In late January 2016, having been scouted by the likes of Arsenal, Liverpool and Manchester City, Williams agreed to an extension of his contract until 2021; the deal included a €50 million buyout clause. He was sent off on 6 February at the end of a goalless home draw with Villarreal, together with opponent Daniele Bonera.

During autumn 2017, Williams scored important late goals in the Europa League against Östersund and Hertha BSC to help his team finish top of the group. On 17 January 2018, he agreed a contract renewal, running until 2025 with an incremental buyout clause of around €80 million.

On 13 January 2019, Williams scored both goals in a 2–0 home league win over Sevilla, finding the net at San Mamés for the first time in 41 league appearances (the previous occasion being in December 2016). His second, involving a turn and sprint from his own half, touch away from the goalkeeper and precise finish at high speed, was described as "incredible" – it was later awarded as the Marca Golden Goal of the season. The fixture was also his 100th successive appearance in the league, only the fifth Athletic player to achieve this and the first outfield player from any Spanish club to do so since Fran in 1993; for his performances, he was named the La Liga Player of the Month.

Williams signed a nine-year contract in August 2019, with his release clause set at €135 million. Late in the same month he started and scored in a 2–0 Basque derby win for his 122nd consecutive Spanish League game, setting a new record by an outfield player in the 21st century ahead of goalkeeper Diego López. On 24 November, he repeated the feat in a 2–1 away victory against Osasuna, breaking a 31–game undefeated streak of the hosts at their El Sadar Stadium; the occasion also marked his 133rd consecutive appearance in the Spanish top tier, establishing a new club record previously held by Carmelo Cedrún.

On 17 January 2021, Williams scored from 20 metres early into extra time of an eventual 3–2 win over Barcelona in the Spanish Supercup final. On 11 September, he celebrated his 300th appearance for Athletic with a goal in a 2–0 victory against Mallorca. A week later, he became the only second player to play in 200 successive Spanish league games as he started in a 0–0 draw away to defending champions Atlético Madrid. On 1 October, he set a new record outright with his 203rd consecutive appearance in the home match with Alavés, breaking the mark set by Juan Antonio Larrañaga of Real Sociedad between 1986 and 1992.

On 17 April 2022, after starting against Celta, Williams passed the six-year mark since he last missed a league match for the club, and extended his own Spanish top-flight record of consecutive games to 224. His six-year run came to an end at 251 on 29 January 2023, when he was left out of the squad for the fixture against the same opposition, a 1–0 loss.

International career

Spain
On 20 March 2015, Williams received his first international call-up, being named in Albert Celades' Spain under-21 squad for friendlies with Norway and Belarus. He made his debut on the 26th against the former, replacing goalscorer Munir El Haddadi at half-time of a 2–0 friendly win in Cartagena.

Williams was listed as one of 11 standby players for Vicente del Bosque's Spain squad at UEFA Euro 2016. He made his senior debut on 29 May, replacing fellow debutant Marco Asensio at the hour mark of a 3–1 friendly defeat of Bosnia and Herzegovina.

On 12 October 2018, Williams debuted for the Basque representative side, playing the full 90 minutes of a 4–2 win over Venezuela at the Mendizorrotza Stadium.

Ghana
Around the time of his Spain debut in 2016, Williams was also coveted by the Ghana national team, being watched by their Spanish scout Gerard Nus. In 2021, having made no competitive appearances for Spain which would have tied him to his birth nation permanently, he spoke of the possibility of playing for Ghana: "My parents are from Accra and I really enjoy going. But I wasn't born or raised there, my culture's here, and there are players for whom it would mean more. I don't think it would be right to take the place of someone who really deserves to go and who feels Ghana 100%." Local media interpreted this as a rejection of any approach from the Black Stars.

Ultimately, on 5 July 2022, Williams announced that he was making himself available for the African nation in time for the 2022 FIFA World Cup. In September, he received his first call-up for friendlies with Brazil and Nicaragua. He made his debut against the former, playing the second half of the 3–0 loss in Le Havre. He was selected in Ghana's squad for the finals in Qatar; within the team, he was nicknamed "Kweku" due to the day in which he was born, a Ghanaian custom.

Personal life
Williams received his Basque first name in honour of a Caritas Internationalis worker in Bilbao who helped his parents after they arrived in Spain in the year he was born; they had been advised by an unidentified lawyer to claim to be from a war-torn country, namely Liberia, when they first entered the country. His younger brother, Nico, is also a footballer and a forward; he too was brought up at Athletic Bilbao.

Williams was one of the stars of the Amazon Prime television documentary series Six Dreams, recorded during the 2017–18 season. He can speak Spanish, Akan, Basque and English. In 2021, he said that he and his family had lost fluency in English, but still communicated with relatives in the Twi dialect of Akan.

Career statistics

Club

International

Honours
Athletic Bilbao
Supercopa de España: 2020–21
Copa del Rey runner-up: 2019–20, 2020–21

Spain U21
UEFA European Under-21 Championship runner-up: 2017

Individual
La Liga Player of the Month: January 2019
Golden Goal of the Season: 2018–19
La Liga Mid-Season African MVP: 2022–23

See also
Afro-Spaniards
List of association footballers who have been capped for two senior national teams

References

External links

 (archive)

1994 births
Living people
Spanish people of Ghanaian descent
Citizens of Ghana through descent
Spanish sportspeople of African descent
Spanish footballers
Ghanaian footballers
Footballers from Bilbao
Footballers from Pamplona
Association football forwards
La Liga players
Segunda División B players
Tercera División players
CD Basconia footballers
Bilbao Athletic footballers
Athletic Bilbao footballers
Spain under-21 international footballers
Spain international footballers
Basque Country international footballers
Ghana international footballers
2022 FIFA World Cup players
Dual internationalists (football)